Samuel Bennett Crooks  was Dean of Belfast in the last third of the 20th century.

He was born on 20 January 1920 into an ecclesiastical family (his father was the Rev. S. B. Crooks, Rector of Killough, Co. Down and then St Stephen’s, Belfast) and educated at Down High School and Trinity College, Dublin. He was ordained in 1944 and became Dean's Vicar and then Vicar Choral at St Anne’s Cathedral, Belfast, until 1949, when he was appointed Rector of St John’s, Orangefield. Later he became Rector of Christ Church Lurgan, then the largest parish in the Church of Ireland, Rural Dean of Hillsborough and Archdeacon of Dromore. In 1970 he became Dean of Belfast, a post he held for 15 years. While at the Cathedral he launched the annual Christmas "sit out" to raise funds for local charities for which he became known as the Black Santa. http://www.belfastcathedral.org/black-santa/. He was made a Chaplain of the Venerable Order of St John of Jerusalem in the Queen's Birthday Honours in February 1976., and admitted OBE in 1981. He died in 1986 aged 66 in a car crash on the Saintfield Road near Carryduff on his way to a meeting at Belfast Cathedral.

In December 2014 an Ulster History Circle blue plaque was unveiled in his memory at St Anne's Cathedral, Belfast.

Notes

1920 births
People educated at Down High School
Alumni of Trinity College Dublin
20th-century Irish Anglican priests
Archdeacons of Dromore
Deans of Belfast
Officers of the Order of the British Empire
1986 deaths